My Sexiest Year is a 2007 romantic comedy/drama starring Frankie Muniz and Harvey Keitel and was written and directed by Howard Himelstein. The film is a romantic coming-of-age story in which the kindness bestowed by a glamorous model is returned 30 years later by the young man in whom she inspired the first stirrings of confidence and love. The film takes place in 1970s Miami and was shot in various locations such as Collins Avenue and Coral Gables Senior High School.

The film had its world premiere at the 2007 Hamptons International Film Festival. As of 2022, the film has yet to receive a DVD/Blu-ray release date.

Plot
Jake Stein (Frankie Muniz) is a 17-year-old who lives with his sick mother and grandfather in Brooklyn. He wants nothing more than to be a writer, but when his mother's health takes a turn for the worse, Jake is sent to Miami to live with his father, "Zowie" (Harvey Keitel), a small-time "handicapper" who gives horse racing tips for a living. Not much of a parent, Zowie has shirked his fatherly responsibilities for most of his son's life. Nonetheless, Jake is excited about the prospects of bonding with his father in sunny Miami.

Jake quickly befriends Mark, a local rich kid, whose excessive drug use helps him get through the pressures of teenage life in Southern Florida, where the "in" crowd only cares about how much money one's parents make, who's coming to one's pool party, and whether or not one is getting laid. As Jake tries to navigate the waters of his new home—while trying to connect with his eccentric father—he meets Marina (Amber Valletta), a famous model who is in town for a photo shoot; the two quickly bond. Jake reminds Marina of her younger brother, who died in a motorcycle accident, and Jake is unable to get over the fact that such a beautiful woman is interested in him. But just when things seem to be going right, all goes terribly wrong. Jake must figure out how to become a man, if he is ever going to finish writing his memoir.

Cast
 Frankie Muniz as Jake Stein
Christopher McDonald as Adult Jake Stein
 Harvey Keitel as Zowie
 Amber Valletta as Marina
 Ryan Cabrera as Rickie
 Haylie Duff as Debbie
 Karolína Kurková as Pia
 Frances Fisher as Faye
 Allan Rich as Papa
 Victor Alfieri as Fabrizio Contini
 Nick Zano as Pierce
 Rachel Specter as Sue Ryker
 Dan Levy as Mark
 Daphna Kastner as Gloria
 Noah Matthews as Mikey
 Ali Costello as Allison
 Chick Bernhard as Rosie
 Ashley Blackwell as Rena
 Jill Curran as Tammy
 Nay K. Dorsey as Jimbo
 Angelina Hakansson as Karina
 Michelle Jones as Shelly Jenkins
 Luis Selgas as Freddy Wilson
 Alfred Nittoli as Gene
 Ante Novakovic as Ange
 Luke Pierucci as Vinny
 Sal Richards as Nick
 Jennifer Safina as Liz
 Anthony Schweiker as Eddie
 Roger Wilson as Paul
 Evis Xheneti as Greta
 Christine Hitt as Pool Girl (uncredited)

References

External links
 
 

2007 films
2007 romantic comedy-drama films
American romantic comedy-drama films
Films scored by Anthony Marinelli
2000s English-language films
2000s American films